Newport Tower may refer to:

 Newport Tower (Rhode Island) in Newport, Rhode Island
 Newport Tower (Jersey City) in Jersey City, New Jersey